Road Trips Volume 3 Number 4 is a live album by the rock band the Grateful Dead.  The 12th of the Road Trips series of archival releases, it was recorded on May 6, 1980, at Recreation Hall, Pennsylvania State University, State College, Pennsylvania, and on May 7, 1980, at Barton Hall, Cornell University, Ithaca, New York.  It was released on September 7, 2010.

Road Trips Volume 3 Number 4 was the second Road Trips album, after Volume 3 Number 3, to contain three CDs; each of the previous entries in the series had contained two CDs.  It was the first Road Trips to be released without a bonus disc.

The first disc of Road Trips Volume 3 Number 4 contains selections from the first sets of both concerts.  Disc two is the complete second set from Penn State.  Disc three is the complete second set from Cornell, except for a few minutes of "Rhythm Devils" and "Space".

Track listing

Disc one
"Jack Straw" (Bob Weir, Robert Hunter) – 7:04
"Peggy-O" (traditional) – 7:03
"Me and My Uncle" > (John Phillips) – 3:08
"Big River" (Johnny Cash) – 5:56
"Loser" (Jerry Garcia, Hunter) – 7:54
"Cassidy" (Weir, John Perry Barlow) – 5:13
"Row Jimmy" (Garcia, Hunter) – 12:02
"Lazy Lightning" > (Weir, Barlow) – 3:40
"Supplication" (Weir, Barlow) – 4:40
"Althea" (Garcia, Hunter) – 9:26
"Lost Sailor" > (Weir, Barlow) – 6:11
"Saint of Circumstance" (Weir, Barlow) – 6:22

Disc two
"China Cat Sunflower" > (Garcia, Hunter) – 6:06
"I Know You Rider" (traditional) – 7:10
"Feel Like a Stranger" > (Weir, Barlow) – 9:55
"He's Gone" > (Garcia, Hunter) – 13:54
"The Other One" > (Weir, Bill Kreutzmann) – 10:21
"Rhythm Devils" > (Mickey Hart, Kreutzmann) – 9:09
"Space" > (Garcia, Phil Lesh, Weir) – 3:45
"Wharf Rat" > (Garcia, Hunter) – 10:32
"Around and Around" > (Chuck Berry) – 4:08
"Johnny B. Goode" (Berry) – 4:18

Disc three
"Shakedown Street" > (Garcia, Hunter) – 13:55
"Bertha" > (Garcia, Hunter) – 6:43
"Playing in the Band" > (Weir, Hart, Hunter) – 9:22
"Terrapin Station" > (Garcia, Hunter) – 13:14
"Rhythm Devils" > (Hart, Kreutzmann) – 4:39
"Space" > (Garcia, Lesh, Weir) – 4:02
"Saint of Circumstance" > (Weir, Barlow) – 6:04
"Black Peter" > (Garcia, Hunter) – 9:39
"Playing in the Band" > (Weir, Hart, Hunter) – 3:29
"Good Lovin'" (Rudy Clark, Arthur Resnick) – 7:52

Personnel

Grateful Dead
Jerry Garcia – lead guitarist, vocals
Mickey Hart – drums
Bill Kreutzmann – drums
Phil Lesh – electric bass
Brent Mydland – keyboards, vocals
Bob Weir – rhythm guitar, vocals

Production
Grateful Dead – producer
David Lemieux – release producer
Blair Jackson – release producer
Dan Healy – recording
Jeffrey Norman – CD mastering
Scott McDougall – cover art
William Ames – photography
James R. Anderson – photography
Jay Blakesberg – photography
Peter Dervin – photography
Steve Vance – package design
Blair Jackson – liner notes

Recording dates
Disc one, tracks 2 – 5 and 8 – 12, and disc two were recorded at Penn State University on May 6, 1980
Disc one, tracks 1, 6, and 7, and disc three were recorded at Cornell University on May 7, 1980

Set lists
Following are the full set lists for the Penn State and Cornell concerts:

Penn State University, May 6, 1980

First set: "Alabama Getaway" > "Greatest Story Ever Told", "Peggy-O"*, "Me and My Uncle"* > "Big River"*, "Loser"*, "Far From Me", "Lazy Lightning"* > "Supplication"*, "Althea"*, "Lost Sailor"* > "Saint of Circumstance"*
Second set: "China Cat Sunflower"* > "I Know You Rider"*, "Feel Like a Stranger"* > "He's Gone"* > "The Other One"* > "Rhythm Devils"* > "Space"* > "Wharf Rat"* > "Around and Around"* "Johnny B. Goode"*
Encore: "Brokedown Palace"

Cornell University, May 7, 1980

First set: "Jack Straw"*, "Tennessee Jed", "Cassidy"*, "Row Jimmy"*, "El Paso", "Easy to Love You", "Althea", "Feel Like a Stranger", "Don't Ease Me In"
Second set: "Shakedown Street"* > "Bertha"* > "Playing in the Band"* > "Terrapin Station"* > "Rhythm Devils"* > "Space"* > "Saint of Circumstance"* > "Black Peter"* > "Playing in the Band"* > "Good Lovin'"*
Encore: "Alabama Getaway"

*included in Road Trips Volume 3 Number 4

References

Road Trips albums
2010 live albums